Piney Pinecreek Border Airport  is a public use general aviation airport located  northwest of the central business district of Pinecreek, in Dieter Township, Roseau County, Minnesota, United States, on the Canada–US border. It is jointly owned by the Minnesota Department of Transportation and the government of Piney, Manitoba. It is shared by the rural communities of Piney, Manitoba and Pinecreek, Minnesota.

Also known as Pinecreek/Piney Pinecreek Border Aerodrome, it is one of six airports that cross the Canada–US border and the easternmost. The other airports, east to west, are International Peace Garden Airport, Coronach/Scobey Border Station Airport, Coutts/Ross International Airport, Whetstone International Airport (Del Bonita/Whetstone International Airport), and Avey Field State Airport.

Needing to extend the runway, the owners found it could not be extended south due to a nearby road, but the land to the immediate north was unused. After arrangements were made with Canadian and Manitoba authorities, the runway was extended across the 49th parallel. The initial and extended runways were turf but have since been paved.

The airport, located in Manitoba and Minnesota, has both United States and Canada customs services and is attractive to tourists, hunters and fishermen. Ground access is available on Manitoba Highway 89 and Minnesota State Highway 89.

The airport is classified as an airport of entry by Nav Canada and is staffed by the Canada Border Services Agency (CBSA). CBSA officers at this airport can handle general aviation aircraft only, with no more than 15 passengers.

History
An airport for the town of Pinecreek was proposed by resident Eugene Simmons in 1949, to expedite cross-border general aviation traffic. The airport initially opened on July 29, 1953, with a runway terminating just before the international border. To allow operation of larger aircraft, a 1150-foot extension was proposed in 1972. However, this had to cross the US-Canadian border and required extensive negotiation between local and national governments. The extended runway and bi-national airport was dedicated on July 28, 1978.

Facilities and aircraft
It has one asphalt paved runway designated 15/33 which measures .

For the 12-month period ending May 31, 2011, the airport had 3,000 general aviation aircraft operations, an average of 250 per month.

Two aprons allow passengers to deplane in either country and walk to the respective customs authority. Pilots and passengers in Canada need to walk across Provincial Trunk Route 89 to report to CBSA, while in the US, the border station is located on the airport side of Minnesota State Highway 89. Fuel tanks are located on the US side.

References

External links
   at Minnesota DOT Airport Directory
 

Registered aerodromes in Manitoba
Airports in Minnesota
Buildings and structures in Roseau County, Minnesota
Transportation in Roseau County, Minnesota
Binational airports
Transport in Eastman Region, Manitoba